Central Dauphin High School is a public high school located in Harrisburg, Dauphin County, Pennsylvania, it is one of two high schools in the Central Dauphin School District, and the first built in the school district. In the 2017–18 school year, there were 1,707 students at the school.

History
The school, built in 1955, replaced the former Lower Paxton High School. The school was named Central Dauphin High School, for the school district. Central Dauphin School District was created in 1957, and this merger of several school districts was completed by the opening of Central Dauphin High School.

Between 1955 and 1972, renovations and additions were added to the school, including the science wing, a planetarium, and a new cafeteria.  In 2003, the planetarium was named for the school's highly inspirational and influential teacher Dennis Phillippy, however was demolished in 2007.

In the late 1990s, overcrowding in the Central Dauphin School District resulted in a proposal to merge Central Dauphin High School with nearby rival Central Dauphin East High School. The proposal was opposed by Central Dauphin High School and was later voted down by the school board (after its removal in the election the week before). In 2000, the school board voted to build a third high school, but in a sudden turnaround by the school board, it was decided that the district would have only two high schools.  A new facility was to be built, and it would be named Central Dauphin High School.

In the 2004–05 school year, the high school moved from its Locust Lane, Lower Paxton Township location to its current Piketown Road, West Hanover Township location. The old building was renovated, and it is now being used as Central Dauphin Middle School. In 2004, former President George W. Bush visited the school, making a speech in the auditorium. Since 1955, the yearbook has been called the Centralian. The school newspaper is called the Rampage.

Central Dauphin High School is one of the largest public high schools in south-central Pennsylvania and holds graduation ceremonies at the Giant Center in Hershey, Pennsylvania.

Extracurriculars
Central Dauphin High School offers a wide variety of clubs, activities and an extensive sports program which duplicates the sports offered at Central Dauphin East High School. Efforts to consolidate some sports between the two district high schools have been resisted by parents.

Athletics
Central Dauphin High School has many varsity and junior varsity teams. The Wrestling team has won four straight team championships from 2007–2011 seasons in AAA.  The Boys' Volleyball team won the AAA state championship in 2009.  Football has won their first AAAA team state championship as of 2011. Girls' soccer won their first AAA title in 2007 followed by a second in 2008.  Boys baseball won the schools first state championship in 1997.

The district funds:

Boys
Baseball – AAAA
Basketball – AAAA
Cross Country – AAA
Football – AAAAAA
Golf – AAA
Indoor Track and Field – AAAA
Lacrosse – AAAA
Soccer – AAAA
Swimming and Diving – AAA
Tennis – AAA
Track and Field – AAA
Volleyball – AAA
Volleyball – AAA
Wrestling- AAA

Girls
Basketball – AAAA
Cheerleading – AAAA
Cross Country – AAA
Indoor Track and Field – AAAA
Field Hockey – AAA
Golf – AAA
Lacrosse – AAAA
Soccer (Fall) – AAAA
Softball – AAAA
Swimming and Diving – AAA
Girls' Tennis – AAA
Track and Field – AAA
Volleyball – AAA

Music Program
Central Dauphin's music program consists of seven bands, four choirs, and three orchestras. Bands include a freshman ensemble, symphonic, wind, two unselect jazz bands, one select jazz ensemble, and a marching band.  The choirs include an all-boys choir, one unselect all-girls choir, a select women’s choir, and a mixed ensemble. The three orchestras are freshman, symphonic, and concert. Each part of the music department holds several concerts throughout the school year, including the annual spring musical, and seasonal concerts held in the auditorium.

Current clubs

Students can create new clubs with the principal's approval. As of the 2021–2022 school year the clubs are:

African-American Heritage Club
Art Club
Chess Club
Fall Play
FBLA (Future Business Leaders of America)
FCCLA (Family, Career, and Community Leaders of America)
Fellowship of Christian Athletes
Finance Club
Four Diamonds
French Club
German Club
History Club
Key Club
Legacy Leadership Club

Mock Trial
Model UN
National Honor Society
Ping Pong Club
Pre-med
Quiz Bowl
Rampage
SAGA (Sexuality and Gender Alliance)
School Store
Science Olympiad
Sci-Fi
Spikeball
Student Council
Students Helping Students
Yearbook

Notable alumni
Michael Boyer, actor 
John DiSanto, Pennsylvania State Senator
Jeremy Linn, Olympic Gold Medalist Swimmer 4 × 100 m Medley Relay, Silver Medalist 100m Breaststroke Atlanta 1996
Eric Martsolf, television actor
Daniel C. Miller, former Harrisburg controller
Jeffrey B. Miller, vice president of security, Kansas City Chiefs
Micah Parsons, professional football player, Dallas Cowboys 
Marty Reid, former ESPN NASCAR broadcaster
Rob Teplitz, former Pennsylvania State Senator
Alyssa Thomas, professional WNBA basketball player, Connecticut Sun
Ryan Whiting, 2012 indoor track and field shot put world champion and 2012 track and field Olympic athlete in shot put
Trey Yingst, Fox News Channel foreign correspondent

References

External links
 Central Dauphin School District
 CDHS Alumni
 Central Dauphin Boys Soccer Team
 Central Dauphin Band Boosters
 CD Action News Website

Educational institutions established in 1955
Education in Harrisburg, Pennsylvania
High schools in Central Pennsylvania
Susquehanna Valley
Schools in Dauphin County, Pennsylvania
School buildings completed in 1955
Public high schools in Pennsylvania
1955 establishments in Pennsylvania